The Pinetree Line was a series of radar stations located across southern Canada at about the 50th parallel north, along with a number of other stations located on the Atlantic and Pacific coasts. Run by North American Aerospace Defense Command (NORAD) (after its creation), over half were staffed by United States Air Force personnel with the balance operated by the Royal Canadian Air Force. The line was the first coordinated system for early detection of a Soviet bomber attack on North America, but before the early 1950s radar technology quickly became outdated and the line was in full operation only for a short time.

History

Plans for what would become the Pinetree Line were underway as early as 1946 within the Permanent Joint Board on Defense (PJBD), a Canadian-U.S. organization. However, the costs of running such a system in the post-war era was too high, and instead Canada concentrated on the areas around Ontario and Quebec, while the United States set up stations in the Midwest and along the eastern seaboard.
With the successful test of an atomic bomb in the USSR, plans changed considerably. In 1949 Congress agreed to a $161 million construction program in co-operation with the RCAF, for a continuous line of stations across southern Canada. The USAF's Continental Air Command and the RCAF met in October 1950 to start planning, and in January 1951 the PJBD presented Recommendation 51/1 for the Extension of the Continental Radar Defence System. The USAF later requested an additional set of six (potentially) mobile stations to provide low-level coverage. Later, it was learned the original radar systems performed better than expected, hence a number of the mobile sites were never deployed.

The system was eventually deployed as a series of 33 main stations and 6 smaller "gap fillers". The majority of these ran in a line at about the 53rd parallel in the west (to offer coverage of major Canadian cities) and about the 50th parallel in the east. A second line ran up the eastern seaboard from the southern tip of Nova Scotia to the southern tip of Baffin Island. Of these, 22 of the main stations and all of the gap fillers were paid for by the USAF, leaving 11 to the RCAF. However 16 of the main stations were staffed by RCAF personnel. On 1 January 1955, the system was officially handed over to RCAF command, and over time an additional 10 stations were added. The stations on the east coast used the Pole Vault system for communication.

The Pinetree Line had several technical problems that limited its usefulness almost immediately. For one, the system used a pulse-Doppler radar, which made it unable to detect targets close to the ground due to "clutter". Another was that its location near population centres meant it offered only a "last minute" warning, and as the USSR moved to jet-powered bombers the warning time became less. Studies were already underway in 1951 to build a much smaller series of much more capable Doppler bistatic radar stations somewhat farther north, which would develop into the Mid-Canada Line. By 1957, just over a year after the Mid-Canada Line was operational, a more advanced long-range search radar, mainly in the Canadian north and Alaska were deployed comprising the Distant Early Warning Line.

The Pinetree stations were kept operational during this period, and most underwent modifications as a part of the deployment of the Semi-Automatic Ground Environment (SAGE). SAGE dramatically reduced the workload at the stations, cutting staff requirements by well over half. By the later 1950s some were being mothballed as newer systems came on line to the north. Nevertheless, many of the Pinetree stations were kept operational into the 1980s, particularly on the Atlantic and Pacific coasts.

Radar stations

Initial sort is based on longitude from east to west.

See also
 List of Royal Canadian Air Force stations
 United States general surveillance radar stations
Radar Station, a 1953 short documentary about the Pinetree Line
 Continental Air Defense Integration North
 Continental Air Defense Command

References

  A Handbook of Aerospace Defense Organization 1946–1980, by Lloyd H. Cornett and Mildred W. Johnson, Office of History, Aerospace Defense Center, Peterson Air Force Base, Colorado
 The Pinetree Line

External links
 1997 video documentary by Greg Marshall – Personal stories from Canada's role in the Cold War and NORAD

Air defence radar networks
Canada–United States relations
Cold War sites in Canada
Military equipment of Canada
Radar stations of the United States Air Force
Royal Canadian Air Force